Marcela Zacarías Valle (born 26 March 1994) is a Mexican professional tennis player.
She has a career-high WTA singles ranking of world No. 159, and a doubles ranking of world No. 119, achieved on 24 October 2022.

Zacarías has won 17 singles and 27 doubles titles on the ITF Circuit, and made her debut for the Mexico Fed Cup team in 2012. Playing for her country in BJK Cup, she has a career win–loss record of 21–9 (as of January 2023).

Zacarías achieved greater success on the ITF Junior Circuit, having reached a career-high combined ranking of world No. 7, on 2 December 2012.

Personal life
In the 2021 distributed film King Richard, Zacarías played 14-time Grand-Slam-champion Arantxa Sánchez Vicario.

Career overview

Performance timeline
Only main-draw results in WTA Tour, Grand Slam tournaments, Fed Cup/Billie Jean King Cup and Olympic Games are included in win–loss records.

Singles
Current after the 2023 Australian Open.

ITF Circuit finals

Singles: 24 (17 titles, 7 runner–ups)

Doubles: 43 (27 titles, 16 runner–ups)

Fed Cup/Billie Jean King Cup participation

Singles (7–0)

Doubles (0–1)

References

External links
 
 
 

1994 births
Living people
Mexican female tennis players
Sportspeople from San Luis Potosí
Tennis players at the 2015 Pan American Games
Pan American Games silver medalists for Mexico
Pan American Games medalists in tennis
Central American and Caribbean Games gold medalists for Mexico
Competitors at the 2014 Central American and Caribbean Games
Tennis players at the 2019 Pan American Games
Central American and Caribbean Games medalists in tennis
Medalists at the 2015 Pan American Games
21st-century Mexican women